The  television anime series, known in North America as  MegaMan NT Warrior,  is produced by Xebec. It is composed of five series and a feature film, Rockman EXE the Movie: Program of Light and Dark. The first series began airing on March 4, 2002 in Japan, with the fifth series concluding on September 30, 2006, totaling 209 episodes. The final series, Beast+, was marketed as a stand-alone series and its episodes were reduced to a twelve-minute run-time.

EXE and Axess were adapted in English by Viz Media and aired on Kids' WB in the United States, beginning May 17, 2003.

Episode list

Season 1

Season 2: Axess

Season 3: Stream

Season 4: Beast

DVD releases
The episode releases in Japan are vastly different from the English ones in both aesthetics and content. In Japan, volumes typically contain three episodes (with the exceptions usually being the first volume in a series to contain two and the last volume to contain four). The Japanese volumes are also released in two not-for-sale "rental" formats, DVD and a VHS, but with identical contents. These versions have slightly different box designs. The DVDs were typically released once a month, but sometimes there were simultaneous releases near the end of a series.

For English releases, each DVD contains four episodes each (originally, the fourth episode was included as a special "bonus" episode with a separate menu from the other three episodes on the DVD). The first six volumes were also released in VHS format; however, they only contained three episodes each (skipping the fourth episode that appeared on the DVDs). Presumably, the VHS versions stopped releasing due to poor sales. The DVDs were originally released somewhat sporadically, but since Volume 5, a new volume had been released every January, April, July, and October in a tri-monthly pattern.

The Japanese DVDs typically contain the episodes themselves with occasional bonus material (such as clean intro sequences or special trailers), as well as (in some cases) promotional merchandise (like wristbands or playing cards). The English DVDs only provide the English-dubbed and edited episodes with optional Spanish voice-track, and they all come with the same bonus features (trailers of Mega Man Battle Network video games or promotional screens for merchandise). They also come with occasional promotional merchandise (like Battle Chips for the PET toys). Additionally, the episodes featured are the Canadian versions; in certain instances, the versions that aired on Kids' WB in the United States were heavily altered (including the combination of certain episodes into one) or were not aired at all.

The 50-minute feature film, Rockman EXE the Movie: Program of Light and Dark, also received a DVD release on September 21, 2005, in Japan. The DVD includes a trailer for the sixth video game, a teaser for the fourth anime series (Beast), and a BassCross E-Reader card for use on Mega Man Battle Network 5. The DVD does not include the Duel Masters movie (which premiered in theaters as a double-feature alongside the film).

Japanese DVDs (EXE)

Japanese DVDs (Axess)

Japanese DVDs (Stream)

Japanese DVDs (Beast)

Japanese DVDs (Beast+)
Since Beast+ episodes are half the length of a normal episode, placing six episodes on a single DVD is equivalent to placing the standard three episodes that previous DVDs have featured, and similarly, having eight episodes on the final volume is equivalent to having four standard episodes.

English DVDs & VHS tapes
The episodes included go by the English version's numbering. VHS releases only include the first six volumes, and they only contain the first three episodes from their DVD counterparts (so every fourth episode was missing in the VHS releases). The VHS release dates were simultaneous with the DVD releases.

References
General
 XEBEC's Rockman EXE Stream anime page
 XEBEC's Rockman EXE Beast anime page
 XEBEC's Rockman EXE Beast+ anime page
 Official site of Pony Canyon, Inc., the publishers of the DVDs in Japan
 Official site of Viz Media, the publishers and distributors of the DVDs in North America. (Archived) 

Specific